"Safe with Me" is a song by British singer Sam Smith, from their debut EP Nirvana (2013). It peaked at number 86 on the UK Singles Chart. The song was written by Sam Smith and Two Inch Punch, the latter also producing the song.

Track listing

Credits and personnel
 Lead vocals – Sam Smith
 Producers – Two Inch Punch
 Lyrics – Sam Smith, Ben Ash
 Label: PMR

Charts

References

2013 songs
Sam Smith (singer) songs
Songs written by Sam Smith (singer)
Songs written by Two Inch Punch